Friedrich August Wilhelm Wenck (4 September 1741, in Idstein – 15 June 1810, in Leipzig) was a German historian. His older brother, Helfrich Bernhard Wenck (1739–1803), was also an historian.

Beginning in 1760 he studied history at the University of Erlangen, then in 1766–68, he worked as an assistant at the Darmstadt Pädagogium. In 1770 he acquired the academic degree of magister of philosophy, and during the following year, became an associate professor of philosophy at the University of Leipzig. In 1780 he succeeded Johann Gottlob Böhme (1717–1780) as professor of history at Leipzig. Within a twenty-year period (1784–1804), on five separate occasions, he served as university rector. In 1799 he was named president of the Societas Jablonoviana.

Published works 
He is best remembered for his three volume Codex juris gentium recentissimi (1781–95), an edition of international treatises from 1735 to 1772. In 1779 he published a German translation (with notes) of Edward Gibbon's History of the Decline and Fall of the Roman Empire (Geschichte Des Verfalls Und Untergangs Des Römischen Reichs). Other noteworthy written efforts by Wenck include:
 Entwurf der Geschichte der Oesterreichischen und Preußischen Staaten, Leipzig 1782 – Outline on history of the Austrian and Prussian states.
 De Henrico I. Misniae et Lusatiae Marchione commentatio (several parts).

References 

1741 births
1810 deaths
People from Rheingau-Taunus-Kreis
University of Erlangen-Nuremberg alumni
Academic staff of Leipzig University
Rectors of Leipzig University
18th-century German historians
19th-century German historians